SV Sodingen is a German association football club based in Herne, North Rhine-Westphalia. The team currently plays in the Landesliga, the seventh tier of German football. Although a regional league side today, the club played in the first division Oberliga West through most of the 1950s and into the early 1960s. In 1955, they finished in second place behind Rot-Weiss Essen and qualified for the German football championship playoffs, finishing third in their group.

Honours
 2. Liga-West
 Champions: 1952, 1960

External links
SV Sodingen website (in German)

Football clubs in Germany
Association football clubs established in 1912
1912 establishments in Germany
Football clubs in North Rhine-Westphalia